Ernest Edward Tyzzer (August 30, 1875 – January 23, 1965)  was an American physician, pathologist and parasitologist. He was involved in cancer research but is particularly noted for his work in parasitology, describing numerous new species of avian parasites in a career spanning 40 years.

Tyzzer attended Brown University from 1893–7, funding his studies on the proceeds of trapping animals such as fox and mink. Before attending medical school, he obtained master's degree on flounder (a type of flatfish), partly undertaken at Woods Hole Oceanographic Institution. He began at Harvard Medical School in 1898.

In 1905, while an assistant in Pathology at Harvard, he studied the histology of the skin lesions in varicella, being the first to recognize inclusion bodies in varicella.

In 1907, Tyzzer was a founder member of the American Association for Cancer Research, serving as its president from 1912–1913.
 
In 1913, when he was an assistant professor and director of cancer research at Harvard University, he and two other scientists (Richard P. Strong and C. T. Brues) studied tropical diseases in Peru and Ecuador.

Tyzzer was appointed head of the Department of Comparative Pathology at Harvard in 1916, remaining in that post until his retirement in 1942.

Personal life
Tyzzer was born in Wakefield, Massachusetts, the youngest of five children. He was married and had two sons.

References

1875 births
1965 deaths
American parasitologists
Harvard Medical School alumni
Brown University alumni
Presidents of the American Society of Parasitologists